The North Branch Grass River flows into the Grass River near Russell, New York.

References 

Rivers of St. Lawrence County, New York